Smyly is a surname, and may refer to:

 Drew Smyly (born 1989), American baseball player 
 Ellen Smyly (1815–1901), Irish charity worker
 Sir Philip Crampton Smyly (d. 1904), Surgeon-in-Ordinary to Queen Victoria and to successive Lords-Lieutenant of Ireland (son of the above)
 Sir Philip Crampton Smyly (colonial administrator) (1866–1953), Chief Justice of Sierra Leone, later Chief Justice of the Gold Coast (son of the above)
 Sir William Josiah Smyly (1850-1941), President Royal College of Physicians of Ireland (son of above Ellen Smyly, brother of Sir Philip d 1904)

See also
 Smilie (disambiguation)